Heideland is a municipality in the Saale-Holzland district, in Thuringia, Germany.

References

Saale-Holzland-Kreis